Colquitt County High School (CCHS) is a public high school located in unincorporated Colquitt County, Georgia, United States, near Moultrie and with a Norman Park postal address; it has a student body averaging 1,700. The school is part of the Colquitt County School District, which serves the whole county.

Academics 
According to the Governor's Office of Student Achievement, the high school's four-year graduation rate is 86.2%. The Office also states that 60.7% of the school's graduates are college ready. The school's overall performance is higher than 59% of schools in the state. The Office notes that the school's improvement is on the rise with its rating of "Beating the Odds".

Athletics

Sports 
The following sports are played at CCHS:
Baseball
Basketball
Cheerleading
Cross country
Diving
Football
Golf
Gymnastics
Soccer
Softball
Tennis
Swimming
Track & field
Wrestling
Volleyball

Football
On January 30, 2008, Rush Propst was named head coach at Colquitt County High School. University of South Alabama head coach Joey Jones interviewed Propst to fill the vacant position as the offensive coordinator.  After community uproar over the interview, Propst decided to stay at Colquitt County.

In just his second year of coaching at Colquitt County High School, Propst took a team that had finished 2–8 in 2007 to the state semifinals in 2009. In 2014 and 2015, Colquitt County had undefeated 15-0 records and won the Georgia State High School Football Championship at the Georgia Dome in Atlanta in both seasons.

The 2015 team won a High School Football National Championship when High School Football America named the Packers national champs.

On June 16, 2016, Propst was suspended for one year for head-butting a player during the 2015 playoffs.
In July 2016, the appealed suspension was reduced to a reprimand.
Colquitt started the 2016 season by losing its first four games.

State titles
Baseball (2) - 1997(4A), 2003 (5A)   *Girls' Basketball (1) - 1946(B) 
Football (3) - 1994(4A), 2014(6A), 2015(6A) 
Boys' Golf (1) - 2006(5A)  *Gymnastics (1) - 2006(All) 
Girls' Tennis (2) - 1986(4A), 1988(4A)

Extracurricular activities

Fine arts

Music 
Colquitt County High School is home to several instrumental and choral ensembles. They perform throughout the school year in the community, attend festivals and competitions throughout the South, and have represented the school in other countries and the Macy's Thanksgiving Day Parade, among other events. The choral department also prepares a spring musical each year, which has become a popular annual pastime for the community.

Academic 
CCHS boasts a variety of academic extracurricular activities and clubs. These include the Math Team, Book Hawgs, Engineering Club, Key Club, National Honor Society, an Academic Decathlon, team, Latin Club, Science Club, Spanish Club, and Technology Club.

Vocational and specialty 
There are also many vocational and specialty clubs and activities offered to students, including 4-H (Sigma Lambda Chi), FBLA, Fellowship of Christian Athletes, FCCLA, FFA, HOSA, Leo Club, Partnerships for Success, Peer Leadership, ROTC, SkillsUSA, Student Government, Unscripted! Drama Club, and the Y Club.

History 
Colquitt County High School is the result of decades of expansions, improvements, and the consolidations of other schools in the county. Notable predecessors to CCHS are Moultrie High School, Norman Park High School, and William Bryant High School. These schools, and others, served Colquitt County students before the merging of the county and city school systems in 1968, and before desegregation around the same time.

Notable alumni
 Bob Alligood, engineer, former Florida state legislator, and recipient of the Colquitt County Career Achievement Award; graduate of Moultrie High School
 Antonio Edwards, former American football defensive end in the NFL (Seattle Seahawks, New York Giants, Atlanta Falcons, Carolina Panthers)
 Cameron Erving, professional football player (Carolina Panthers)
 Reatha Clark King, scholar, former professor, dean, and university president, emeritus board chair of NACD; member of the Board of Overseers of the Malcolm Baldrige Program for Excellence; Valedictorian of Moultrie High School for Negro Youth; recipient of the Colquitt County Career Achievement Award
 Nate Lewis, former professional football wide receiver in the NFL (San Diego Chargers, Chicago Bears)
 Dennis Powell, former professional baseball player (Los Angeles Dodgers, Seattle Mariners, Milwaukee Brewers)
 T. J. Smith, professional football player for the Minnesota Vikings

References

External links

 Colquitt County High School
 Colquitt County High School
 Colquitt County School District
 Colquitt Packers
 50th Regiment Band

Schools in Colquitt County, Georgia
Public high schools in Georgia (U.S. state)